Pohrebyshche Raion (translit. Pohrebyschens'kyi raion) was a raion (district) of Vinnytsia Oblast in west-central Ukraine. The administrative center of the district was the town of Pohrebyshche. The raion was abolished and its territory was merged into Vinnytsia Raion on 18 July 2020 as part of the administrative reform of Ukraine, which reduced the number of raions of Vinnytsia Oblast to six. The last estimate of the raion population was

Geography
Pohrebyshche Raion was situated on the Podillian forest-steppe area in the north-eastern part of Vinnytsia Oblast. To the north it bordered Zhytomyr Oblast (Ruzhyn Raion) and to the east Kyiv Oblast (Skvyra Raion, Volodarka Raion, Tetiiv Raion). The Ros River finds its source in the village of Ordyntsi, formerly in Pohrebyshche Raion.

History
Pohrebyshche Raion was formed on March 7, 1923 as a part of Kiev Governorate, but on February 27, 1932 it was included in the newly formed Vinnytsia Oblast. Although the area of the raion has changed over the years. The biggest change was in 1963 when Plyskiv Raion was dissolved.

Subdivisions
There were one urban-type settlement, 57 villages and five minor settlements in the Pohrebyshche Raion. There were one city council and 26 village councils.

Town
Pohrebyshche (Погребище)

Villages

Famous people from Pohrebyshche Raion
 Mykhailo Melnyk (1944, Ordyntsi – 1979), Ukrainian historian, poet and dissident 
 Valentyn Rechmedin, writer, journalist
 , virtuoso guitarist
 , a member of the Ukrainian Central Rada
 , architect, and church figure of Transcarpathia
 , scientist in the field of radio electronics

See also
 Administrative divisions of Vinnytsia Oblast

References

Notes

Sources
 Nina Hnatiuk: Vinnytchyna. (Kiev 1998). .
 Petro Tronko: Istoriya mist i sil Ukrainskoi RSR. Vinnytska oblast. (Kiev 1972). 
 Pohrebyschenskyi Raion's page at Verkhovna Rada

Former raions of Vinnytsia Oblast
1923 establishments in Ukraine
Ukrainian raions abolished during the 2020 administrative reform